Diethylsuccinoylsuccinate is an organic compound with the formula [CH2C(OH)=C(CO2Et)]2 (Et = ethyl). A tetrasubstituted derivative of 1,4-cyclohexadiene, the compound is the enol tautomer of the corresponding cyclohexadione.  It is produced by base-induced condensation of diethyl succinate:
2 EtO2CCH2CH2CO2Et   [CH2C(OH)=C(CO2Et)]2  +  2 EtOH

Diethylsuccinylsuccinate is valued as a precursor to the quinacridone pigments.  For example, it reacts with two equiv of anilines to give the diamines [CH2C(N(H)Ar)=C(CO2Et)]2, which undergoes cyclization upon treatment with acid to give dihydroquinacridone.

When heated in the presence of acid, diethylsuccinoylsuccinate converts to 1,4-cyclohexanedione via hydrolysis of the esters followed by decarboxylation.

References

Cyclohexadienes